The Beach Boys are an American rock band formed in Hawthorne, California, in 1961. Their discography from 1961 to 1984 was originally released on the vinyl format, with the 1985 album The Beach Boys being the group's first CD release. The Beach Boys' catalogue has been released on reel-to-reel, 8-track, cassette, CD, MiniDisc, digital downloads, and various streaming services.

The group has released 29 studio albums, eleven live albums, 61 compilation albums, 1 remix album, and 75 singles. The release dates and sequence of the Beach Boys' albums in the UK up to Pet Sounds differ significantly from the original US releases.

Studio albums

Live albums

Compilation albums

Remix albums

Singles
Listed below are Beach Boys A and B sides issued in the US. For Beach Boys singles not issued under the group name, EP tracks, featured tracks, and non-American A-sides, see other songs. In total the Beach Boys have had 10 number one singles across the world and across all charts.

1960s

1970s

1980–present

Year-End Charts

Billboard Year-End performances

Cash Box Year-End performances

Other songs associated with members of the group

Extended plays
 Surfin' Safari (1963, SWE)
 Surfin' U.S.A. (1963, UK, FR, NZ)
 Shut Down Volume 2 (1963, US)
  Louie Louie (1964,  FR)
 Beach Boys Concert (1964, UK)
 Fun, Fun, Fun (1964, UK, AUS) — #19 UK EPs
 Dance, Dance, Dance (1964, FR, ESP)
 4-By The Beach Boys (1964, US, UK, POR) — #11 UK EPs
 Help Me, Rhonda (1965, POR, FR, ESP)
 Barbara Ann (1965, POR)
 Hits (1966, UK) — #1 UK EPs
 Then I Kissed Her (1966, POR)
 Sloop John B (1966, FR, ESP, POR)
 California Girls (1966, ESP)
 Wouldn't It Be Nice (1966, FR)
 God Only Knows (1966, UK) — #3 UK EPs
 Good Vibrations (1966, POR, SWE)
 Mountain Of Love (1967, ESP)
 White Christmas (1967, ESP)
 Wild Honey (1967, AUS) 
 I Can Hear Music (1967, NZ)
 Cotton Fields (1970, BR)
 Sail On Sailor (1977, UK)
 1969: I'm Going Your Way (2019)
 Christmas Instrumentals (2022)

Other album appearances

Music videos

Television themes

 "Karen" — theme from the 1964–1965 NBC situation comedy Karen

See also
List of songs recorded by the Beach Boys

Notes

A  Chart positions sourced from the 1972 re-release backed with Carl and the Passions — So Tough.
B  Chart positions are for the 1974 re-release of Wild Honey paired with 20/20.
C  Initially paired with a Pet Sounds re-release.
D  Chart position for the 1976 US release.
E  Canada's "Surfin' U.S.A." peak position is taken from the 1974 re-release.
F  "Marcella" did not enter the Billboard Hot 100, but peaked at No. 110 on the Bubbling Under Hot 100 Singles chart.
G  American and Canadian chart positions are for the 1975 re-release.

H  "Little Saint Nick" did not enter the Billboard Hot 100, but peaked at No. 3 on the Billboard Christmas Singles chart.
I  "Why Do Fools Fall in Love" did not enter the Billboard Hot 100, but peaked at No. 120 on the Bubbling Under Hot 100 Singles chart.
J  "She Knows Me too Well" did not enter the Billboard Hot 100, but peaked at No. 101 on the Bubbling Under Hot 100 Singles chart.
K  "The Man With All the Toys" did not enter the Billboard Hot 100, but peaked at No. 3 on the Billboard Christmas Singles chart.
L  "Little Deuce Coupe" (with James House) chart position No. 31 refers to the CAN Country chart.. The song did not chart on the main singles chart.

References

External links
Extended Beach Boys Discography
The Ones That Got Away – a guide to the Beach Boys' lost albums
Comprehensive American discography
Comprehensive British discography

Discography
Discographies of American artists
Pop music group discographies
Rock music group discographies